Adeem Hashmi (born; 1 August 1946 - 5 November 2001) (Urdu: عدیم ہاشمی) was a Pakistani poet, writer and playwright.

Life and career
Hashmi's birth name is Fashih Uddin. He is considered one of the 
finest modern poets of Urdu. He wrote the drama serial "Aghosh" for Pakistan Television, a successful drama serial of its time. He also wrote a few stories for the comedy-drama series "Guest House" and also songs for radio and TV. He lived most of his life traveling to USA and for this heart transplant in 2001, he went to the United States  on his last trip to his friend and prominent poet Ifti Nasim who then took care of his burial because of the post 9/11 crisis.

Literary works
Hashmi works includes books, poetry, poems and lyrics.

Death
Hashmi died during a heart transplant surgery at the cook county hospital on 5 November 2001  and laid to rest in a cemetery for Pakistanis in Chicago, USA.

References

1946 births
2001 deaths
Pakistani poets
American writers of Pakistani descent
Pakistani emigrants to the United States
Pakistani writers about music
Pakistani dramatists and playwrights
20th-century American poets
American male poets
20th-century American male writers